"Natural Sinner" is a song by British rock band Fair Weather, released in July 1970 as their debut single. It peaked at number 6 on the UK Singles Chart.

Release 
Fair Weather was formed after the disbandment of Amen Corner, with the name coming from frontman Andy Fairweather Low. "Natural Sinner" was the band's release, as a non-album single, despite releasing an album, Beginning from the End, at the end of the year. Despite releasing further singles, "Natural Sinner" was the band's only hit and they split in 1972.

Track listing 
7": RCA / RCA 1977
 "Natural Sinner" – 4:24
 "Haven't I Tried (To Be A Good Man)" – 4:09

Personnel 
 Andy Fairweather Low – vocals, guitar
 Blue Weaver – organ
 Neil Jones – guitar
 Clive Taylor – bass
 Dennis Byron – drums

Charts

Cover versions 
 In 1970, German band leader James Last covered the song on his album Non Stop Dancing 11.
 In 1971, American R&B vocalist Lloyd Price released a cover as a single.
 In 1994, a cover by Elton John, recorded in 1970, was released on his compilation album Chartbusters Go Pop.
 In 2008, Andy Fairweather Low released a solo version on his compilation album The Very Best of Andy Fairweather Low – The Low Rider.

References 

1970 singles
1970 songs
RCA Victor singles